Shane Rashad Brathwaite (born 8 February 1990 in Bridgetown) is a hurdler from Barbados who competed in the 110 metres hurdles at the 2012 Summer Olympics but did not finish the race in the qualifying heats. His gold medal in the octathlon at the 2007 World Youth Championships in Athletics made him the first person from Barbados to win a gold medal at a global athletics championship.

He competed at the 2020 Summer Olympics.

Brathwaite competed for Texas Tech University at Lubbock, Texas. Although he shares a birthplace, surname and specialty with Ryan Brathwaite, the two are not related.

Competition record

1Disqualified in the final

References

External links

1990 births
Living people
Barbadian male hurdlers
Texas Tech University alumni
Texas Tech Red Raiders men's track and field athletes
Olympic athletes of Barbados
Athletes (track and field) at the 2012 Summer Olympics
Athletes (track and field) at the 2016 Summer Olympics
Athletes (track and field) at the 2020 Summer Olympics
Sportspeople from Bridgetown
Commonwealth Games medallists in athletics
Commonwealth Games bronze medallists for Barbados
Athletes (track and field) at the 2014 Commonwealth Games
Athletes (track and field) at the 2018 Commonwealth Games
Pan American Games gold medalists for Barbados
Pan American Games bronze medalists for Barbados
Pan American Games medalists in athletics (track and field)
Athletes (track and field) at the 2015 Pan American Games
Athletes (track and field) at the 2019 Pan American Games
Central American and Caribbean Games gold medalists for Barbados
Competitors at the 2010 Central American and Caribbean Games
Competitors at the 2018 Central American and Caribbean Games
World Athletics Championships athletes for Barbados
Pan American Games gold medalists in athletics (track and field)
Central American and Caribbean Games medalists in athletics
Medalists at the 2015 Pan American Games
Medalists at the 2019 Pan American Games
Medallists at the 2014 Commonwealth Games